Water polo at the 2015 Southeast Asian Games was held from 10 to 16 June 2015 at the OCBC Aquatic Centre in Kallang, Singapore. The competition was held in a round-robin format, where the top 3 teams at the end of the competition will win the gold, silver, and bronze medal respectively.

Participating nations
A total of 130 athletes from five nations competed in water polo at the 2015 Southeast Asian Games:

Draw
The draw ceremony for the team sports was held on 15 April 2015 at Singapore. Both men's and women's competitions was played in the event's single round robin format.

Men
  (Host)
 
 
 
 
Women
 
 
 
 
  (Host)

Competition schedule
The following was the competition schedule for the water polo competitions:

Medalists

Medal table

Final standing

Men

Women

References

External links
 

 
Kallang